Speedboats for Breakfast is the sixth solo studio album by Australian singer/songwriter James Reyne released on 19 April 2004. The album is Reyne's first studio album since Design for Living in 1999 and features a cover of Olivia Newton-John's "Have You Ever Been Mellow".

On the lead single "Bug" Reyne said: "I wanted to create a song out of playing the same four chords going round and round, building and growing all the time, with things coming in and dropping out. The listener knows there's transition but there's no real point where the change is obvious."

In a 2013 interview, when asked if there is a song he likes playing live, Reyne responded with "Oh usually some of the newer ones, there’s a song of mine called "Rainbow’s Dead End" that I like playing."

Review
Tomas Mureika of All Music said the album was a grungier, heavier sound, unlike anything Reyne had ever done before. "Working with collaborator Scott Kingman, Reyne concocted a terrifying album that includes tracks with titles like "Nail," "Hangman's Wages," and "Pusherman." It all culminates in the album's final track, a remake of Olivia Newton-John's "Have You Ever Been Mellow" that does an almost punk run-through of the original. From the half-submerged clown's head on the album's original cover to the dense lyrics and production within, Reyne made the most frightening album of his career. At least he proved he could still push the envelope with the best of them".

Track listing
CD/DD
 "Bug" - 4:05
 "The Rainbow's Dead End" - 4:34
 "Stagefright"	- 2:42
 "Glamourpuss" - 3:06
 "Pusherman"	 - 3:29
 "Nail" - 3:31
 "Love In a Strange Strange Land"	- 4:41
 "Hangman's Wages" - 3:58
 "Hooray and Hallelujah" - 4:25
 "Lustre" - 6:05
 "Mellow" - 2:52

Credits
 Bass – Mark Gray, Rex Fernandez
 Drums – John Watson, Max Waugh
 Engineer – Scott Kingman
 Guitar, Bass, Strings, Programmed By – Scott Kingman
 Guitar, Bass, Vocals – Brett Kingman
 Keyboards – Dan Knight
 Vocals, Guitar, Bass, Keyboards, Strings – James Reyne

Release history

References

2004 albums
Liberation Records albums
James Reyne albums